2019  hurricane season may refer to any of the following tropical cyclone seasons

2019 Atlantic hurricane season
2019 Pacific hurricane season
2019 Pacific typhoon season
2019 North Indian Ocean cyclone season
2018-19 South-West Indian Ocean cyclone season
2019-20 South-West Indian Ocean cyclone season
2018-19 Australian region cyclone season
2018-19 Australian region cyclone season
2018-19 South Pacific cyclone season
2019-20 South Pacific cyclone season